Roberto Gonzalo Ortiz Núñez (June 30, 1915 – September 15, 1971) was a Cuban professional baseball player.  He was an outfielder over parts of six seasons (1941–44, 1949–50) with the Washington Senators and Philadelphia Athletics.  For his career, he compiled a .255 batting average in 659 at bats, with eight home runs and 78 runs batted in.

He was born in Camagüey, Cuba, and died in Miami at the age of 56.

External links
, or Retrosheet

1915 births
1971 deaths
Almendares (baseball) players
Birmingham Barons players
Charlotte Hornets (baseball) players
Chattanooga Lookouts players
Diablos Rojos del México players
Habana players
Havana Cubans players
Havana Sugar Kings players
Leones de Yucatán players
Major League Baseball outfielders
Major League Baseball players from Cuba
Cuban expatriate baseball players in the United States
Marianao players
Mexican Baseball Hall of Fame inductees
Montreal Royals players
Sportspeople from Camagüey
Philadelphia Athletics players
Tecolotes de Nuevo Laredo players
Washington Senators (1901–1960) players
Cuban expatriate baseball players in Mexico